The UEFA European Championship has its own video games licensed from European football's governing body, UEFA. Six games have been released so far, with the first game released in 1996. Originally held by Gremlin Interactive, it was then held by Electronic Arts from Euro 2000 until Euro 2012. Konami have the rights from Euro 2016 onwards.

UEFA Euro 1992

The game developed and published by TecMagik was released for the Sega Master System in 1992 to coincide with UEFA Euro 1992. The game featured both single-player and multiplayer game modes. Players could play in a friendly match or in the tournament mode.

UEFA Euro 1996

The game by Gremlin Interactive modified some parts in their Actua Soccer title, including the 16 teams present in the final stage with accurate rosters and stadiums, as well as Euro 96 mode, Exhibition Match, Practice Penalties, and Practice game.

It was sold for Windows, DOS, and the Sega Saturn. The Saturn version was released in Europe only in May 1996. It was the subject of considerable media hype and was a major system-seller for the Saturn in the United Kingdom.

UEFA Euro 2000

After Electronic Arts purchased the license, it was expected the game would be as good as World Cup 98, a major hit two years before. Euro 2000 uses a modified version of the FIFA 2000 engine.

Paul Oakenfold provided the soundtrack, with the songs:
 "The Hub"
 "Headcharge"
 "Tribe"
 "Hand of God"
 "Bunker"
 "Formula" (shortened version of "Formula Football", a song included in Euro 2000: The Official Album)

Oakenfold also remixed E-Type's "Campione 2000" (the tournament's official theme song).

The game was a bestseller in the UK, replacing Gran Turismo 2.

UEFA Euro 2004

The game was released on PC, PlayStation 2 and Xbox on 7 May 2004. There was also going to be a version for Nintendo GameCube but it was cancelled.

Players can choose from 51 national teams and it includes more game modes than UEFA Euro 2000, such as a fantasy mode where two teams composed of hand-picked players square-off with each other, leagues and a knock-out "home and away" friendly match and a penalty shoot-out mode, as well as Euro 2004 qualifying, and Euro 2004 itself.

UEFA Euro 2008

The game was released for PlayStation 2, PlayStation 3, PlayStation Portable, Xbox 360, and PC on 17 April 2008. It featured all 53 teams of Europe.

UEFA Euro 2012

The game was released by EA Sports as a downloadable expansion pack for FIFA 12 on PlayStation 3, Xbox 360, and PC on 24 April 2012. It featured all 53 teams of Europe and 8 stadiums of UEFA Euro 2012. It marks a change in EA's strategy, with all previous football games centred on either the World Cup or European Championships having been released as full-priced standalone games.

UEFA Euro 2016

The game was released by Konami as a free DLC on Pro Evolution Soccer 2016. Real Madrid and Wales player Gareth Bale features on the cover. The PlayStation 3 and PlayStation 4 versions were released as standalone both physically and digitally.

UEFA Euro 2020

The game was released by Konami as a free DLC on eFootball PES 2020 in June 2020, and on the 2021 Season Update on launch day. It includes the official kits and player likenesses for all 55 officially licensed UEFA teams. The update also includes five out of eleven venues of the tournament, as well as the official match ball.

See also
UEFA Champions League video games
FIFA World Cup video games
FIFA (video game series)
Pro Evolution Soccer series
Actua Soccer

References

 
Association football video games
EA Sports games
Electronic Arts franchises
Konami franchises
video games
Gremlin Interactive games
Video game franchises introduced in 1996
Lists of video games by franchise
Video games developed in the United Kingdom